Cyanoderma is a genus of passerine birds in the Old World babbler family Timaliidae. Many of these species were formerly placed in the genus Stachyris

Taxonomy
A molecular phylogenetic study published in 2012 found that the genus Stachyris was paraphyletic. In the subsequent reorganization to create monophyletic genera, the genus Cyanoderma was resurrected to accommodate a group of species formerly assigned to Stachyris. The genus Cyanoderma had been introduced in 1874 by the Italian zoologist Tommaso Salvadori with chestnut-winged babbler as the type species. The name combines the Ancient Greek kuanos meaning "dark-blue" with derma meaning "skin".

Species
The genus contains the following species:

Deignan's babbler Cyanoderma rodolphei collected in 1939 at Doi Chiang Dao in Thailand is considered synonymous with the rufous-fronted babbler.

References

 
Bird genera
Taxa named by Tommaso Salvadori